Acantholimon gillii is a species of plant described by Karl Heinz Rechinger and Mogens Engell Köie. Acantholimon gillii is part of the genus Acantholimon and the family Plumbaginaceae. No subspecies are listed in the Catalog of Life.

References 

gillii